This article covers the period 1884 to present. Before the beginning of the Open era in April 1968, only amateurs were allowed to compete in established tennis tournaments, including the four Grand Slams. Wimbledon, the oldest of the majors, was founded in 1877, followed by the US Open in 1881, the French Open in 1891, and the Australian Open in 1905. Beginning in 1905 and continuing to the present day, all four majors have been played yearly, with the exception of the two World Wars, 1986 for the Australian Open, and 2020 for Wimbledon. The Australian Open is the first major of the year (January), followed by the French Open (May–June), Wimbledon (June–July), and US Open (August–September). 

There was no prize money and players were compensated for travel expenses only. A player who wins all four current major tournaments in the same calendar year, as an individual or as part of a doubles team, is said to have achieved the "Grand Slam". If the player wins all four consecutively, but not in the same calendar year, it is called a "Non-Calendar Year Grand Slam". Winning all four at some point in a career, even if not consecutively, is referred to as a "Career Grand Slam". Winning the four majors and a gold medal in tennis at the Summer Olympics has been called a "Golden Slam" since 1988. Winning all four plus gold at some point in a career, even if not consecutively, is referred to as a "Career Golden Slam". Winning the Year-end Championship also having won a Golden Slam is referred to as a "Super Slam". Winning the four majors in all three disciplines a player is eligible for–singles, doubles, and mixed doubles–is considered winning a "boxed set" of Grand Slam titles. 

The current Grand Slams are the four most prestigious tournaments in the world held every year, they are distinguished by participation from almost every top player and by their two-week duration, 128-player draw in women's singles. It's extremely rare for a player to win all four tournaments, "the Grand Slam", in one calendar year. This was only achieved three times since 1888 by Maureen Connolly, Margaret Court, and Steffi Graf, the latter of whom stands alone in winning the "Golden Slam". These are some of the important records since the start of women's tennis in 1884. Most statistics are based on the data at the WTA Tour and International Tennis Federation, the official websites of each respective Grand Slam tournament and published sources though this is not a definitive list due to the time periods involved. Active streaks and active players are in boldface.

All tournament records

Tournament records and streaks

Singles titles and finals

Tournament streaks 

|

Most titles at a single tournament

Most finals at a single tournament

Titles by court surface type 

Note - Incomplete. Many pre-Open Era titles missing.

Match records and streaks

Consecutive match streaks

Career winning percentage

Calendar year achievements

Best single season

Year-end Championships 

(1972 – present)

Grand Slam tournament records

Grand Slam singles totals

Grand Slam tournament consecutive streaks
This section is for consecutive streaks across all Grand Slam tournaments. If a player skips a tournament the streak ends.

(3) Denotes multiple streaks within one category

active streaks in boldface

Grand Slam match winning percentages

* Not all sources agree with one of Wills' losses. She did not play two matches because of appendicitis, causing her to miss the 1926 Wimbledon Championships. Wimbledon did not assign a loss to her or a win to her opponent. The other tournament gave her a loss instead of a default to her and a walkover to her opponent, neither of which count as a loss or a win. It is unknown why the tournament chose to assign a loss to her. Taking these facts into consideration, her adjusted win percentage would be 125–3 = 97.66%.

Grand Slam career achievements

Grand Slam, Golden Slam and Super Slam

Winning tournament without losing a set
 Minimum 2

Youngest and oldest winners

Players who reached all four major finals during their careers

Players who reached all four major finals in one calendar year

Refer also to the "Calendar year achievements" section.

Season streaks

Title leaders by decade

minimum 2 titles

1880s

1890s

1900s

1910s

1920s

1930s

1940s

1950s

1960s

1970s

1980s

1990s

2000s

2010s

2020s

Calendar year achievements

Four majors

Three majors

Consecutive majors

Four

Three

Two

Single season winning percentage

Individual major tournaments

Titles per tournament
 Minimum 3 titles

Consecutive titles per tournament

 The French Open was only a Grand Slam tournament from 1925 onwards
 (3) Denotes multiple times

Finals per tournament

Match wins per tournament

Match win streaks per tournament
A streak does not end if a player skips one or more tournaments between two wins.

Winning percentage per tournament

 ** both losses were actually "default", Suzanne Lenglen's adjusted win percentage would be 100%.

WTA Tier I, Premier Mandatory and Premier 5

 Overall totals include Tier I, Premier Mandatory, and Premier 5 tournaments only.
 Tier I tournaments were played on 3 surfaces, (carpet) ceased as a surface after 1995.

Titles by court type

Match wins/ percentages

Rankings

WTA Prize money leaders
See WTA Tour records#WTA career prize money leaders. As prize money has increased strongly in recent decades, the lists of prize money leaders all-time and for the WTA Tour period (since 1973) are the same.

See also 

Lists of tennis records and statistics
Open Era tennis records – Women's singles
WTA Tour records
World number 1 women tennis players from 1883–present
List of WTA number 1 ranked singles tennis players
List of female tennis players
All-time tennis records – Men's singles
ATP Tour records
Grand Slam (tennis)
List of tennis tournaments

References 

Tennis records and statistics